USS Wapakoneta has been the name of more than one United States Navy ship, and may refer to:

 , a patrol craft in commission from 1942 to 1955, which was given the name USS Wapakoneta (PC-579) in February 1956 after she was decommissioned and which she held while in reserve until stricken in 1960.
 , a large harbor tug in service from 1963 to 2001

United States Navy ship names